The Union Dutchwomen represented Union College in ECAC women's ice hockey during the 2014–15 NCAA Division I women's ice hockey season.

Recruiting

2014–15 Dutchwomen

Schedule

|-
!colspan=12 style=""| Regular Season

References

Union
Union Dutchwomen ice hockey seasons